The number of people executed in India since independence in 1947 is a matter of dispute; official government statistics claim that only 57 people had been executed since independence. However, available information from other sources indicates that the official government figures are false, and the actual number of executions in India may run to several thousand.

Research by the People's Union for Democratic Rights (PUDR) has located government records of 1,422 executions in 16 states in the decade from 1953 to 1963 alone. PUDR located this information in an appendix of the 35th report of the Fourth Law Commission in 1967. The National Law University Delhi compiled a list of persons executed in India since 1947 and found that at least 752 individuals had been executed, including the period from 1 January to 15 August 1947. Their report was compiled "as per responses received from Central prisons in India. Certain prisons have either provided information only for a limited period or refused to provide any information or did not have any records available." Therefore, the actual number of persons would be much more than 752.  While information about the number of executions should be available with individual prison departments within each state, the government has been reluctant to share such information. For example, authorities in Kerala claimed that all records of executions had been destroyed by termites. Andhra Pradesh gave the same reason for not furnishing post-1968 records. Bihar claimed that the state did not maintain records of executions, while Tamil Nadu's Additional Director General of Police (Prisons) refused to provide any records at all. According to Alexander Jacob, Additional Director General of Police (Prisons) of Kerala, "nearly 50 people had been executed in Kerala in the post-Independence period".

Rasha alias Raghuraj Singh, executed on 9 September 1947 at Jabalpur Central Jail, is presumed to be the first person executed in independent India. Akshay Thakur, Mukesh Singh, Pawan Gupta and Vinay Sharma, who were hanged on 20 March 2020, were the last persons to be executed in India. Rattan Bai Jain, executed on 3 January 1955 at Tihar Jail, is presumed to be the first woman executed in independent India.

List
This is not an exhaustive list of prisoners executed in independent India, and is not meant to be a reference for the total number of prisoners who have been executed in India since independence. There are no official collated figures available for executions in India, and this list has been compiled from multiple sources. Unless otherwise noted, all persons were executed by hanging.

See also
 Capital punishment in India

References

External links
 Death Penalty Research Project's list of prisoners executed in India since 1947

Executed people
India
Lists
Executed people